Firetrap is a British clothing company, founded in 1993, specialising in menswear and accessories. It was the main brand within the WDT company (World Design and Trade), which also owned its sister brand Full Circle along with previous brands SC51 and Sonnetti.

Firetrap's distinctive edgy design inspirations saw it achieve rapid growth in international markets from 2006 - 2008 under the leadership of MD John Gorman, before being sold to Sports Direct.

Now owned by Frasers Group (the retail company founded by Mike Ashley), Firetrap had taken part of the Sports Direct group of global brands such as Slazenger, Gelert and Kangol, among others.

References

External links
 

Sports Direct
Clothing companies established in 1993
Clothing brands of the United Kingdom